Mitochondrial tRNA-specific 2-thiouridylase 1 is an enzyme that in humans is encoded by the TRMU gene.

This gene is a member of the trmU family. It encodes a mitochondria-specific tRNA-modifying enzyme that is required for the 2-thio modification of 5-taurinomethyl-2-thiouridine tRNA-Lys on the wobble position of the anticodon.

References

Further reading